Cruziohyla is a genus of frogs in the subfamily Phyllomedusinae. They occur from Nicaragua and Honduras in Central America south to the Amazon Basin in South America. This genus was erected in 2005 following a major revision of the Hylidae and fully reviewed in 2018. Species in this genus were previously placed in the genera Agalychnis or Phyllomedusa.

These frogs are characterized by extensive hand and foot webbing. Their eye has a bicoloured iris. Tadpoles develop in water-filled depressions on
fallen trees. The name Cruziohyla honors Brazilian herpetologist Carlos Alberto Gonçalves da Cruz.

Species
There are three Cruziohyla species:
 Cruziohyla calcarifer (Boulenger, 1902) — splendid leaf frog
 Cruziohyla craspedopus (Funkhouser, 1957) — fringe tree frog
 Cruziohyla sylviae Gray, 2018 — Sylvia's tree frog

References

 
Phyllomedusinae
Amphibians of Central America
Amphibians of South America
Amphibian genera
Taxa named by Jonathan A. Campbell
Taxa named by Darrel Frost